The Dublin County Board of the Gaelic Athletic Association (GAA) or Dublin GAA is one of the 32 county boards of the GAA in Ireland, and is responsible for Gaelic games in the Dublin Region and the Dublin county teams. The teams and their fans are known as "The Dubs" or "Boys in Blue". The fans have a special affiliation with the Hill 16 end of Croke Park.

The county football team is second only to Kerry when it comes to the total number of All-Ireland Senior Football Championship

As of 2009, there were 215 clubs affiliated to Dublin GAA — the second highest, ahead of Antrim and Limerick, which each had 108.

Governance

Dublin GAA has jurisdiction over the area that is associated with the traditional county of Dublin. There are 9 officers on the Board, including the Cathaoirleach (Chairperson), Mick Seavers, Vice-Chairman, Ken O'Sullivan and Treasurer, Finbarr O'Mahony. 

The Board is subject to the Leinster GAA Provincial Council.

Notable officers
The following members have also held notable positions in the GAA:
James Boland, elected Chairman of the Dublin County Committee in 1892, was the Dublin County representative on the Central Council the next two years. His son, Harry was elected Chairman of the Dublin County Committee four times between 1911 and 1914. 
Tom Loftus, former Chairman of the Dublin County Board was appointed Vice Chairman of the GAA Leinster Council (1969–1972) and later Chairman of the GAA Leinster Council (1972–1974)
Four men from the Dublin GAA organisation have served as President of the GAA:
Daniel McCarthy, 1921–1924
Seán Ryan, 1928–1932
Dr Joseph Stuart, 1958–1961
John Horan, 2018-2021

In addition, the politician John Bailey was chairman for 10 years.

Clubs
For details on the Board's clubs, see this category and the list of Gaelic games clubs in Ireland#Dublin.

Restructuring
The GAA conducted a review of the structure of the Dublin GAA organisation in 2002 because of the huge population inequities and investigated the feasibility of dividing the County into more population-appropriate structures. Plans to divide Dublin into two teams – North Dublin and South Dublin – were proposed in 2002 but rejected by the Dublin County Board. Currently, the Board has only decided to divide its development teams. These teams are not considered to be a move towards dividing the county but are in fact a move designed to identify and develop young talent for the County as a whole. The restructured developments teams are North, South and West.

Crest and symbols
In 2003/4, the Dublin County Board tried unsuccessfully to copyright the Dublin crest in use at the time. The crest at the time was declared to be in the public domain by the Irish High Court as it was too similar to other crests in use by Dublin City Council and other Dublin sports bodies. In line with other county boards and in order to prevent further loss of revenue, the county board designed a new crest drawing from the county's historical past which could be copyrighted and registered as a trademark.

The symbolism of the crest is three castles in flame which signifies the city of Dublin; a raven which signifies the county of Fingal; a Viking longboat which signifies the county of Dún Laoghaire-Rathdown; a book which signifies the county of South Dublin. The name Áth Cliath in Irish replaces the previous name "Dublin".

Sponsorship
In October 2013, Dublin signed a new sponsorship deal with insurance firm AIG in excess of €4m over a five-year period. The deal would also incorporate ladies' football and camogie for the first time.

Football

Clubs

The Dublin Senior Football Championship is an annual club competition between the top Dublin clubs. The winners of the Dublin Championship qualify to represent their county in the Leinster Championship and in turn, go on to the All-Ireland Senior Club Football Championship. The current (2021) Dublin County Champions are Kilmacud Crokes, who have won the competition 9 times in their history. The first winners of the Dublin football championship were Erins Hope in 1887, who were the student club attached to St Patrick's Teacher Training College, Drumcondra. St Vincent's have won the most titles with a total of 26.

The Dublin Intermediate Football Championship is the second tier football championship. The Intermediate champions go on to play in the Senior football Championship. The 2012 Dublin Intermediate County Champions are Cuala who became champions with a win over Fingallians. St Brigid's are the most successful intermediate club, having won on five occasions.

Parnell Park hosts all the major games in the Dublin club football championships.

County team

Dublin first won the All-Ireland Senior Football Championship (SFC) in 1891 by defeating Cork by a margin of 2–1 to 1–1. It won the All-Ireland SFC the following year as well, with victory over Kerry.

The Dublin team of the 1970s won four All-Ireland SFCs (1974, 1976, 1977 and 1983) and won seven Leinster Senior Football Championship (SFC) titles (six of which were consecutive). It was also the first team to play in six consecutive All-Ireland SFC finals (from 1974 to 1979), a feat later matched by Kerry in 2009.

Dublin and Meath were involved in one of the most famous of Leinster championship encounters in 1991, the Dublin and Meath four-parter. The teams had to go to three replays in their Leinster SFC first-round match before a winner could be found. This series of games had the added factor of Dublin and Meath being long-time fierce rivals, a rivalry that intensified when Meath won four from the previous five Leinster SFCs and two All-Ireland SFCs over the previous five years, to replace Dublin as the strongest team in the province of Leinster. Meath eventually won the series, thanks to a last-minute goal scored by Kevin Foley, and a point scored by David Beggy, in the third replay. Foley took seven steps for the winning goal.

In the 2010s, Dublin produced the greatest teams in modern times. The Dubs won seven All-Ireland SFCs (five of which were consecutive, the first team to achieve this feat).

On 25 March 2017, when beating Roscommon by 2–29 to 0–14 in a National League game at Croke Park, Dublin set a new record of playing 35 games in League and Championship without defeat. The previous record, held by Kerry, had stood for 84 years.

The three most significant historical achievements occurred in the years 2018, 2019 and 2020. Dublin set new records for both the county and on national levels. 2018 saw the Dublin footballers win a fourth consecutive All Ireland championship for the very first time in their proud counties’ history and in doing so equalling the feats of Wexford 1915 to 1918, Kerry 1929 to 1932 and Kerry once more from 1978 to 1981. 2019 was the year of two new national records set, beginning with a ninth provincial title followed by an unprecedented fifth All Ireland championship in succession. In doing so besting the attempts of Kerry in 1982, narrowly defeated by Offaly by 1–15 to 0–17. Then in 2020, Dublin broke their own provincial and national records by winning the Leinster senior football championship for the tenth year in a row and going on to record a sixth All Ireland victory in a row. Dublin had the longest run unbeaten in the All Ireland Championship stretching from 31 August 2014 all the way up until 14 August 2021 spanning 2,541 days and winning an incredible 42 games plus 3 draws for a total of 45 games unbeaten

Hurling

Clubs

The Dublin Senior Hurling Championship is an annual club competition between the top Dublin clubs. The winners of the Dublin Championship qualify to represent their county in the Leinster Senior Club Hurling Championship and in turn, go on to the All-Ireland Senior Club Hurling Championship. The 2013 Dublin County Champions were Ballyboden St. Enda's. The first winners of the Dublin hurling championship were Metropolitans in 1888. Faughs have won the most titles with a total of 31.

The (2013) champions of the Dublin Minor Hurling Championship are Ballyboden St Endas.
2014 Champions were Croke's
2015 Champions were Cuala who were runners up in the Leinster Final
2016 Champions are Cuala who won the Leinster Final for the first time since Crumlin 79/80.Cuala also became the first Dublin Hurling Club to win the All Ireland Senior Club Hurling Championship,with back to back wins in 2017 and 2018

Parnell Park hosts all the major games in the Dublin club hurling championships.

County team

Dublin's hurlers have failed to replicate the success of the county's football side, having won the Senior All-Ireland Hurling final on 6 occasions, most recently in 1938. In terms of All-Ireland titles, they are significantly behind hurling's big three of Kilkenny, Cork and Tipperary. Their six titles do however place them fifth in the overall winners' list, jointly tied with Wexford.

Dublin has won the Leinster Championship on 24 occasions, the second most Leinster titles of any side, although they remain well behind Kilkenny, who have won the Leinster Championship 70 times.

Dublin have won the National Hurling League three times: in 1929, 1939 and 2011. This places them joint seventh (with Clare) on the overall winners list, having won 16 fewer titles than top-ranked Tipperary.

In 2009, former Clare manager, Anthony Daly was appointed manager of Dublin. Under his management, Dublin contested the Leinster Final, but lost by 2 goals to Kilkenny.

Dublin won the National Hurling League in May 2011 after a 12-point win over Kilkenny, their first national title since they won the All Ireland in 1938.

On 7 July 2013, Dublin won the Leinster Final against Galway on a 2–25 to 2–13 scoreline, scoring 2–21 from play. This was the first time they had won the competition since 1961. The Goalkeeper from the 1961 team presented the Dublin Captain, Johnny McCaffrey, with the Bob O'Keefe trophy.

Handball

Hardball Singles winners
Dublin has won the Senior hardball singles All-Ireland title on 15 occasions, two more than their nearest rivals Kilkenny. The 2005 All-Ireland senior hardball singles title was won by Dubliner Eoin Kennedy who plays his club handball for St Brigids. Other former winners for Dublin are T. Soye and A. Clarke.

Softball Singles winners
Dublin has won the Senior softball singles on nine occasions, more than any county other than Kilkenny (who have twenty-five wins to date). The former winners for Dublin include M. Joyce 1925, W. McGuire 1927, L. Rowe 1947, 1949 and 1951, P. Ryan 1980 and E. Kennedy 2004, 2005 and 2006.

Camogie

Dublin is the 2nd most successful county in the women's field sport of camogie, During the period from 1932 to 1966, they had nearly one-third of the affiliated clubs in the Association and won all but eight of the championships they contested, winning a ten consecutively and an eight consecutively in a period interrupted only by a controversial 1956 All-Ireland semi-final defeat to Antrim. In a period of revival, they won three National Camogie League titles in 1979–1983 and the 1984 All-Ireland Senior Camogie Championship. The total could have been greater had not Dublin County Board disaffiliated during two periods of unrest in the 1940s. Three Dublin clubs have won the All-Ireland Senior Club Camogie Championship, Austin Stacks (1971 and 1972), Eoghan Ruadh (1967), and Crumlin (1985).

Structure
The camogie structure in Dublin was arguably the most successful in the country and differed from its provincial counterparts. The league and championship were organised in the winter months, and weekly programmes of Dublin Senior Club Camogie League, Dublin Senior Club Camogie Championship and Isle of Man Cup matches were contested by clubs such as Austin Stacks, Celtic, CIE, Cuchulainns, Eoghan Ruadh, Jacobs, Muiris O'Neills, Naomh Aoife, and Optimists on a dedicated camogie ground in the Phoenix Park (first used 1922, reopened 1933, new pitch opened 1987) although Celtic had a ground in Coolock and CIE had a ground in Inchicore. This left Dublin camogie to concentrate on a summer closed season which contributed to its successes in the but led to difficulties when Dublin clubs began to compete in the provincial and All Ireland club championship in the 1960s. Although Celtic were the first winners of the All Ireland, they did not compete the following year.

Notable players
Notable players include team of the century members Eileen Duffy, Sophie Brack, Kay Mills and Úna O'Connor, player of the year award winners Alice Hussey and Yvonne Redmond, All Star award winners Eimear Brannigan, Ciara Lucey and Louise O'Hara, and stars from the "golden age" such as Sophie Brack, Emmy Delaney, Kathleen Cody, Peggy Griffin, Doreen Rogers and Mary Walsh.

Administrators
Máire Ní Chinnéide, Máire Gill, Eilish Redmond, Nell McCarthy, Úna Uí Phuirséil, Brídín Uí Mhaolagáin and Phyllis Breslin have served as presidents of the Camogie Association).

Expansion
Under Camogie's National Development Plan 2010–2015, "Our Game, Our Passion", five new camogie clubs were to be established in the county by 2015.

Ladies' football

See also
 The Dubs – Dublin GAA since the 1940s
 Dublin county football team

References

External links

 

 
Gaelic games governing bodies in Leinster
Leinster GAA
Sport in County Dublin